Ronald Lee "Ronnie" Kauffman (born December 25, 1946 in Seattle, Washington) is an American pair skater. With sister Cynthia Kauffman, he a four-time (1966–1969) U.S. national champion and a three-time (1966–1968) World bronze medalist. They represented the United States at the 1964 Winter Olympics and the 1968 Winter Olympics, placing 8th in 1964 and 6th in 1968.

They were inducted into the U.S. Figure Skating Hall of Fame in 1995.

Competitive highlights
(with Kauffman)

References

External links
 
  

American male pair skaters
Olympic figure skaters of the United States
Figure skaters at the 1964 Winter Olympics
Figure skaters at the 1968 Winter Olympics
Sportspeople from Seattle
1946 births
Living people
World Figure Skating Championships medalists
21st-century American people
20th-century American people